Sidney Edward Silk (17 April 1921 – 26 June 2004) was an Australian rules footballer who played for Essendon in the Victorian Football League (VFL) during the early 1940s.

Silk was recruited locally and made his debut in the 1941 Preliminary Final victory over Carlton at the Melbourne Cricket Ground but could not hold his place for the Grand Final. Silk did however play in Essendon's 1942 premiership team, as the 19th man. Once his league career was over, Silk spent three seasons at Brunswick in the Victorian Football Association (VFA), where he later umpired.

References

Holmesby, Russell and Main, Jim (2007). The Encyclopedia of AFL Footballers. 7th ed. Melbourne: Bas Publishing.

1921 births
2004 deaths
Essendon Football Club players
Essendon Football Club Premiership players
Brunswick Football Club players
Australian rules footballers from Melbourne
Victorian Football Association umpires
One-time VFL/AFL Premiership players
People from Chelsea, Victoria